Todor Gečevski (born 28 August 1977) is a Macedonian former professional basketball player.

Professional career
While playing with KK Zadar, Gečevski was named to the All-EuroCup First Team in the 2008–09 season, being named the league's best center. He then signed with PAOK in Greece, and played there from 2009 to 2011. In 2011, he returned to Macedonia, and signed with MZT Skopje Aerodrom. In 2014, he joined Rabotnički.

Macedonian national team
Gečevski was one of the most influential players of the Macedonia national basketball team in the past decade. He played at the 1995 FIBA Europe Under-16 Championship with Macedonia's junior national team. As a member of the senior Macedonian national team, he played at the EuroBasket 1999 and the EuroBasket 2009. He was considered a leader of the team at the EuroBasket 2011 in Lithuania, where he was crucial in the victories of the Macedonian national team against Croatia (78–76) and Greece (72–58), in the group stage. Despite carrying multiple injuries throughout the tournament, he participated until breaking both hands against Georgia. After that incident, he still wanted to play, even with fractures, which was an inspiration for his teammates, in their historic run to the semi-finals.

Championships and cups as player

National domestic league championships
1999–2000: Nikol Fert: Macedonian League
2003–2004: Rabotnički: Macedonian League
2004–2005: Zadar: Croatian League
2007–2008: Zadar: Croatian League
2011–2012: MZT Skopje Aerodrom: Macedonian League
2012–2013: MZT Skopje Aerodrom: Macedonian League
2013–2014: MZT Skopje Aerodrom: Macedonian League

National domestic cup championships
1997–1998: Tikveš: Macedonian Cup (Finalist)
2001–2002: Nikol Fert: Macedonian Cup
2003–2004: Rabotnički: Macedonian Cup
2004–2005: Zadar: Croatian Cup
2005–2006: Zadar: Croatian Cup
2006–2007: Zadar: Croatian Cup
2011–2012: MZT Skopje Aerodrom: Macedonian Cup
2012–2013: MZT Skopje Aerodrom: Macedonian Cup
2013–2014: MZT Skopje Aerodrom: Macedonian Cup
2014–2015: Rabotnički: Macedonian Cup

References

External links
Todor Gečevski at aba-liga.com
Todor Gečevski at eurobasket.com
Todor Gečevski at euroleague.net
Todor Gečevski at draftexpress.com
Todor Gečevski at fiba.com

1977 births
Living people
ABA League players
Centers (basketball)
Greek Basket League players
KK MZT Skopje players
KK Rabotnički players
KK Zadar players
Macedonian men's basketball players
P.A.O.K. BC players
Sportspeople from Kavadarci
Power forwards (basketball)
S.S. Felice Scandone players